Chiscas is a town and municipality in the Colombian Department of Boyacá, part of the subregion of the Gutiérrez Province.

Born in Chiscas 
 Cristóbal Pérez, former professional cyclist

Municipalities of Boyacá Department